The  Hum Award for Best Television Sensation Male is one of the Hum Awards of Merit presented annually by the Hum Television Network and Entertainment Channel (HTNEC). It is given to an actor who has delivered an outstanding debut performance while working within the television industry. At the 1st Hum Awards (for 2012), award was given to Shehryar Munawar Siddiqui for his role in Meray Dard Ko Jo Zuban Miley. The nominations are solely made by Hum membership.

Since its inception, the award has been given to four actors, as of 2016 year ceremony, Feroze Khan is the most recent winner of this award.

Category

As of 1st ceremony Hum honored a debut Male actor for giving his spectacular performance in drama release in 2012, This category officially termed as Best Television Sensation or unofficially known as Best Male Debut.

Winners and nominees
This category has no nominations since it is given to only one actor, who has delivered outstanding debut performance. However nominations can be made but it is not shown during nomination announcement and winner is only revealed during the ceremony. Following the hum's practice, Actors won for the dramas released by year of their Pakistan qualifying run, which is usually (but not always) the drama's year of release. Date and the award ceremony shows that the 2010 is the period from 2010 to 2020 (10 years-decade), while the year above winners and nominees shows that the dramas year in which they were telecast, and the figure in bracket shows the ceremony number, for example; an award ceremony is held for the dramas of its previous year.

2010s

See also 
 Hum Awards
 Hum Awards pre-show
 List of Hum Awards Ceremonies

References

External links
Official websites
 Hum Awards official website
 Hum Television Network and Entertainment Channel (HTNEC)
 Hum's Channel at YouTube (run by the Hum Television Network and Entertainment Channel)
 Hum Awards at Facebook (run by the Hum Television Network and Entertainment Channel)]

Hum Awards
Hum Award winners
Hum TV
Hum Network Limited